Józef Świder (born 19 August 1930 in Czechowice-Dziedzice, died 22 May 2014 in Katowice) was a Polish composer and music teacher.

He graduated from the Academy of Music in Katowice (formerly PWSM – today Akademia Muzyczna), then continued his studies with Goffredo Petrassi at the Accademia Nazionale di Santa Cecilia in Rome. Since 1954, he taught composition and music theory at the Akademia Muzyczna in Katowice. Among his pupils were the Polish composers Aleksander Lasoń, Julian Gembalski, Andrzej Dziadek and Wiesław Cieńciała. Professor at the University of Silesia (Uniwersytet Śląski) where, from 1985 until 1999, he managed the Institute for Music Education. Since 1984 professor of the postgraduate course for choir directors at the Akademia Muzyczna in Bydgoszcz. Member of the jury of numerous Polish and international choir competitions.

Józef Świder was the recipient of many awards, among them the Prize of Poland’s Prime Minister for his works for children. He was a member of the Union of Polish Composers (ZKP).

Compositions 

 more than 200 choral songs
 3 operas: Magnus (1970), Wit Stwosz (Veit Stoss – 1974), Bal Baśni (The Fairy Tales Bal – 1977)
 Wokaliza (Vocalise) for soprano and viola (1953)
 Concerto for piano and orchestra (1955)
 Concerto for soprano and orchestra (1956)
 Suite for accordion and string orchestra (1979)
 9 masses with organ or orchestra, including the Missa angelica (2009)
 Oratorium legnickie (Legnica Oratorio – 1991)
 Concerto for guitar and string orchestra (1998)
 Te Deum for solo voices, choir and orchestra (2001)    
 Litania Gietrzwałdzka (Litany of Gietrzwałd – 2007)
 Singet dem Herrn ein neues Lied for 4 soloists, 2 choirs and orchestra (2014)

He wrote also chamber music, works for guitar, organ, wind orchestra, as well as music for theatre and film.

References

Polish male classical composers
1930 births
2014 deaths
Polish classical composers
Polish opera composers
20th-century Polish musicians
20th-century classical composers
21st-century Polish musicians
21st-century classical composers
Accademia Nazionale di Santa Cecilia alumni
People from Czechowice-Dziedzice
20th-century male musicians
21st-century male musicians